Global regionalization is a process parallel to globalization. A feature of the global community is the globalization of many processes and the development of international relations and interdependence of modern states in the second half of the 20th century. Globalization is evident not only globally, but also regionally. A component of international relations in the 21st century is regional development and cooperation. In this regard, the importance of the regional factors are significant to international relations. Most of the changes which are observed in today's world are associated with the development of the information sphere. There were predictable transformations that give rise to the beginning of the entry of humanity into a global information society. The researchers are not five definitions of information society-related parameters identification of newness of the world which are technological, economic, concerning employment, and spatial or cultural nature. The significance of the information society in terms of its impact on the system are consisting of international relations. In 2000 G-8 Summit in Okinawa adopted a Charter on Global Information Society, which reflected the changes in world information. The same issues a lot of attention were paid to the Millennium Summit.

Regionalization as a trend of global development 
The driving forces of regionalization are not only the state but also non-governmental structures (the economic "interest groups", NGOs, political parties, etc.). World regionalism is one of the manifestations of globalization and at the same time, it is the opposite trend. Many developing countries see regionalization attempt to confront global competition. In the context of globalization acquires special relevance selective protectionism - gradual global economic integration, combining openness to the outside world with the protection of national interests. Universal theories of regions exist on the theories of the problem, type, goals, and objectives of the study. The following theoretical concepts reflect the processes of regionalism, which is a consequence of globalization. They can be as: Multipolar world theory, the theory of large spaces, the theory of convergence, and the regional joint doctrine. The study of regionalism analyzed the regionalization emerging in response to the challenges of globalization, and regionalization, such as institutional integration of the process of interpenetration merging national productions which combine the social and political institutional structure of the state. There are different forms and types of integration. They are characterized by the degree of freedom of movement within groups and factors of production. Currently, there are mentioned forms of regional economic integration such as free trade area (FTA); Customs Union (CU); single or common market (BP); Economic Union (EU); Economic and Monetary Union (EMU), and others.

Information society and international relations 

Increased exposure to information changes on international relations caused several features of the information. The first feature - information not only decreases or disappears in its large-scale use but is the starting point for the formation of new species and new qualities. The second feature - information is a fundamental principle for the development and decision-making at all levels of government, including the level of global governance. Third - feature information is the "Oedipus effect", which is the ability to influence the mind and behavior of individuals and society in general. Developing of the global information society are influenced by the progress of new information and communication technologies (ICT) in conjunction with the globalization of markets, both within individual countries and internationally. As a result, the harmonious joining of the information society and respecting the necessary balance required coordinating efforts by the state as a body that can fully express the interests of society. Creating a global information society requires overcoming informational imbalances that exist in the world between different countries and regions, as well as information imbalances existing within themselves, for example, between different social groups. Because of these disparities, the task of building the information society acquires varying degrees of importance for different countries. Due to the intensification of information exchange and its interplay with economic imbalances interaction available information provided to the growing influence of politics, economics, and culture.
 
In 1993 the Vice President of US - A. Gore used the term "information superhighway." In the field of information, the states like Singapore, Finland, Sweden, Denmark, Canada, Switzerland, Norway, Australia and Iceland are according to the United States. In the information technology ratings Russia is in the  sixth place in the top ten. Below - Morocco, Egypt, Sri Lanka, Bulgaria, Vietnam, the Philippines, Peru, Tanzania. In 1996 was adopted the programme " Participation in international cultural exchange" by the Federal Law. To stay among the countries that affect global politics and largely define it, needs to strengthen active in shaping the global information society. At the end of 2001 Russia issued to the First Committee of the UN General Assembly resolution "Developments in the field of information and telecommunications in the context of international security". However, according to the Institute of the Information Society, 64% of the population of Russia does not feel the need to use the Internet. This figure was the result of adding Methodology Center for International Development at Harvard University "Ready for the networked world" (Readiness for the Networked World) and Russian realities which is relevant to the assessment: human capital, business climate and using of ICT in culture. It appears to the "effect resource economy." It is most clearly seen when comparing the two global markets: the global oil market which is estimated at 650 billion dollars, (Russia's share in it - 16%); ICT world market - about $1 trillion share in it represents the hundredths of a percent (Vaganov, 2004).
The impact which formed of global information society on international relations has not only positive but also negative effects. Thus, the importance of international cooperation is often less important for the media industry, which allows for requests of the audience. Everywhere we are seeing a decline in international news programs, very costly and have a constant audience for stories related to the consumption and criminal chronicle (Atlas Monde diplomatique, 2007). Media increasingly contribute to the formation of world opinion, laying patterns to assess the achievements of globalization as well as risks and challenges of globalization. For example, growth media publications about the terrorist threat is much ahead of terrorist activity in the world (Chernikov, 2002). However, there is no sufficient information on such global issues as water crisis, or human trafficking. All this points are need for the transformation of information policy.

Unrecognized states 

The list of current unrecognized states in scientific publications is large. It includes the Republic of China in Taiwan and the Turkish Republic of Northern Cyprus. Often can be added the Republic of Somaliland, Tamil Eelam (Ceylon), and more recently - the Islamic State of Waziristan, whose independence was proclaimed in February 2006. Occasionally this context refers to Southern Sudan, Kashmir, Western Sahara, Palestine, Kurdistan, and some other areas (e.g. exotic Sealand). Consequently, the unrecognized state - is the common name of public entities who are possessing all the attributes of statehood (control of territory, control system, the actual sovereignty) at the same time deprived of full or partial international diplomatic recognition and thus can not de jure act as in international relations. They should not be confused with self-declared republics (- it is education, which is itself declared, but no more). Some authors believe that the term "unrecognized state" - is incorrect (they believe that an unrecognized state - is education that passed even though the short period of statehood, failed) and prefer the term "State de facto". International legal conflict between the right of nations and self-determination is enshrined in the famous decision of the UN General Assembly on decolonization in 1960. The principle of territorial integrity of States -  is the principle of inviolability of borders which is officially recognized by all European countries, USA and Canada in the Conference on Security and Cooperation in Europe in Helsinki in 1975.
Uncertainty stated by the international community negatively affects its legal status and operational capabilities. Such a state can not be in active economic activities and can not conclude trade contracts and implement multilateral investment and infrastructure projects. The area relies only on the international community for humanitarian aid, social and cultural projects, and cooperation with various countries and regions in its infancy. Thus the political and legal recognition of any territory depends on its existence and development. The top prospects in terms of possible transformations are the current status of Kosovo. It is about independence in some form, as this concerned the United States and the European Union. Serbia will only be able to postpone such a decision or to bargain for themselves some political and economic concessions (integration of Serbia into the EU or Kosovo section). On the other hand, if the recognition of Kosovo is qualified as a unique case (a unique case) it could provoke a serious precedent in countries where the problem of ethnic separatism. Abkhazia, Transnistria, and South Ossetia can rely on partial, incomplete recognition of Russia, but their prospects are far from obvious. This "half independence" will not be recognized by the United States, European Union, India, China, and many other countries. There is the slightest chance of changing the status of Nagorno-Karabakh. This situation is mainly determined by the position of the US, EU, Russia, Iran, and Turkey. To effectively address the problem of unrecognized states is likely to develop clear international legal criteria under which after a certain period unrecognized state formation can count on international recognition. With all the reservations can be stated that unrecognized independent state players are the regional and international politics. Their influence on political processes is quite noticeable. Globalization has created additional opportunities for the long-term existence of unrecognized states without their formal recognition by other countries. It is gradually becoming the norm.

References

Global Regionalization as a Way to Counteraction the Global Financial Threats Dr. Victor Reutov (Crimean economic institute SHEE «Vadym Hetman Kyiv National Economic University» Simferopol)

Globalization